"Day After Day" is a song by the British rock band Badfinger from their 1971 album Straight Up. It was written by Pete Ham and produced by George Harrison, who also plays slide guitar on the recording. The song was issued as a single and became Badfinger's biggest hit, charting at number 4 in the United States and number 10 in the UK, ultimately earning gold accreditation from the Recording Industry Association of America.

Recording
"Day After Day" was written and sung by Pete Ham and produced by George Harrison, who plays some of the slide guitar parts of the song along with Ham. The record also features Leon Russell on piano. As the song was unfinished at the time Harrison left the Badfinger album to produce the Concert for Bangladesh, the final mix was done by Todd Rundgren, who took over Straight Up after Harrison's departure.

Release
Released as a single in  the US in November 1971 (January 1972 elsewhere), it would become the group's highest charting single there, peaking at number 4 on the Billboard Pop Singles chart. It also peaked at number 10 on the UK Singles Chart in January 1972. It remains one of the band's best-known songs, most notably for the slide guitar solos. It went Gold in March 1972, becoming the band's first and only gold single. "Day After Day" reached number 10 on Billboard's Easy Listening chart.

Personnel
Badfinger
Pete Ham – lead vocals, acoustic guitar, slide guitar
Tom Evans – backing vocals, bass guitar
Joey Molland – backing vocals, acoustic guitar
Mike Gibbins – drums, percussion

Additional musicians
George Harrison – slide guitar
Leon Russell – piano

Chart performance

Weekly charts

Year-end charts

Cover versions and other uses
In 1972 The Lettermen released an album Lettermen 1 with this song on side 1.
Also in 1972 Engelbert Humperdinck covered the song for his album In Time.
Also in 1972 The Brady Bunch covered the song on their album Meet the Brady Bunch.
In 1986 Savatage covered the song on their album Fight for the Rock.
In 1990 Athens, Georgia rock band Dreams So Real covered the song for their album Gloryline.
In 1990 synthpop band Exotic Birds covered the song for their album Equilibrium.
In 2006 Rod Stewart covered the song on his album Still the Same… Great Rock Classics of Our Time.
In 2006 Neal Morse covered the song on his album Cover to Cover.
In 2006 an instrumental version of the song can be heard near the end of the ″Join the Club" episode of The Sopranos. 
In 2007 the song was used in a TV commercial for the NBA celebrating the revival of the Boston Celtics.
In 2007 the song was featured in "Eternal Moonshine of the Simpson Mind", a Season 19 episode of the animated TV series The Simpsons.
In 2008 Midge Ure covered the song on his album 10.
In 2017 the song was used in the movie My Friend Dahmer.
In 2019 the song was used in the movie Annabelle Comes Home.
In 2020 the song was used in the movie Boss Level.

References 

Apple Records singles
Badfinger songs
1971 singles
1972 singles
Songs written by Pete Ham
Song recordings produced by George Harrison
1970s ballads
Pop ballads
Rock ballads
1971 songs